David "Dai" Evans (1872 – 29 January 1912) was a Welsh international rugby union forward who played club rugby for Penygraig and international rugby for Wales.

Evans was born in Maenclochog, Pembrokeshire, but came to the Rhondda Valley to find work. A policeman by profession, Evans was one of the first 'Rhondda forwards', an aggressive style of forward player who was expected to play a more physical style game.

Rugby career
Evans first came to note as a rugby player when he was selected to face Scotland as part of the 1896 Home Nations Championship. Originally a collier, Evans became a police officer in 1892 and his size and strength typified the style of forward player the Welsh selectors turned to in the late 19th century. The previous game, the Championship opener against England, saw the first 'Rhondda forward' when Sam Ramsey of Treorchy was selected. Evans played club rugby for neighbouring team Penygraig, and was the first international cap for the club.

Evans was one of five new caps to be brought into the pack for the 1896 game against Scotland, after Wales had suffered a heavy defeat away to England. Wales beat Scotland 6-0, and Evans was reselected to face Ireland for the last game of the tournament. Played at Lansdowne Road, the new Welsh forward play was no match for the Irish kick-and-rush tactics which saw Ireland win 4-8. Despite the defeat, Evans was back for the only match of the 1897 Championship, in a tournament disrupted by Wales leaving the International Rugby Board due to The Gould Affair. The one game Wales played was against England, and Evans played in a pack with Rhondda players Dick Hellings and Jack Rhapps. The game ended with the largest win for Wales over England.

When Wales were accepted back into the International Rugby Board in 1898, Evans found his place in the Welsh team taken by Joseph Booth; but he was reinstated for his last appearance in the final match of the tournament against England. Evans' reintroduction by the selectors was seen by the English press as an attempt to intimidate the England team. Whether this was intentional or not, the result ended in an English victory, and the end of Evans' international career, being replaced by Jere Blake the next season. He died in 1912, at the age of 39 from tuberculosis.

International matches played
Wales
  1897, 1898
  1896
  1896

Bibliography

References

1872 births
1912 deaths
20th-century deaths from tuberculosis
Cardiff RFC players
Glamorgan Police RFC players
Penygraig RFC players
Rugby union forwards
Rugby union players from Pembrokeshire
Tuberculosis deaths in Wales
Wales international rugby union players
Welsh miners
Welsh police officers
Glamorgan Police officers
Welsh rugby union players